WXCR (92.3 FM) is a radio station licensed to serve New Martinsville, West Virginia.  The station is owned by Seven Ranges Radio Company, Inc. It airs a Classic rock music format.

The station was assigned the WXCR call letters by the Federal Communications Commission on July 17, 2003.

References

External links
WXCR 92.3 Online

XCR
Wetzel County, West Virginia
Classic rock radio stations in the United States